Peque or variation, may refer to:

Places
 Peque, Antioquia, a municipality in the Department of Antioquia, Colombia
 Peque, Zamora, a municipality in the Province of Zamora, Spain

People
 Peque Gallaga (born 1943), Filipino filmmaker

Nicknamed
 El Peque, the Spanish-language version of the nickname Shorty
 Gerard Fernández (born 2002), Spanish soccer player nicknamed "Peque"
 Diego Schwartzman (born 1992), Argentinian tennis player nicknamed "El Peque"

Other uses
 AISA I-11B Peque, Spanish-made civil utility airplane
 Los Peques, Argentine 3D animated TV show

See also

 
 PEC (disambiguation)
 Pec (disambiguation)
 Peck (disambiguation)
 Pek (disambiguation)
 PEK (disambiguation)
 PEQ (disambiguation)